was a town located in Minamikanbara District, Niigata Prefecture, Japan.

As of 2003, the town had an estimated population of 12,503 and a density of 293.84 persons per km². The total area was 42.55 km².

On April 1, 2005, Nakanoshima, along with the town of Oguni (from Kariwa District), the village of Yamakoshi (from Koshi District), and the towns of Koshiji and Mishima (both from Santō District), was merged into the expanded city of Nagaoka.

Transportation

Railway
  JR East - Shin'etsu Main Line

Highway
  Hokuriku Expressway - Nakanoshima-Mitsuke IC
 
 

Dissolved municipalities of Niigata Prefecture
Nagaoka, Niigata